Manzese is an administrative ward in the Ubungo District of the Dar es Salaam Region of Tanzania. According to the 2002 census, the ward has a total population of 66,866. Manzese was founded as a squatted informal settlement and had a population of 90,000 in 1975. A third of its adults were working full-time. By 1980, it had infrastructure such as roads and sanitation facilities.

References

Kinondoni District
Wards of Dar es Salaam Region